Suga Suga is a 2021 Nigerian romantic comedy film written by Priscilla Okpara directed by Richard Omos Iboyi. The film stars Taiwo Obileye, Ayo Adesanya, Tana Adelana and Wole Ojo in the lead roles. The film had its theatrical release on 30 April 2021 and received mixed reviews from critics.

Cast 

 Taiwo Obileye as Dr. Durojaiye
 Ayo Adesanya as Ireti
 Tana Adelana as April Yekini
 Wole Ojo as Aaron
 Charles Inojie as Banabas
 Gregory Ojefua as Ovie
 Vivian Anani as Miss Banjo
 Christian Paul as Chief Wema
Priscilla Okpara as Becky
Mc Mbakara as Felix

Synopsis 
The film is based on a wealthy billionaire who craves lust towards young girls while his family members are angry with him. On the other hand, a young intelligent man decides to work as a maid at the mansion of the billionaire after failing to get a decent job as a driver.

Production 
The film project marked the maiden feature film production venture for the Nigerian 360 entertainment company G-Worldwide Entertainment. The film executive producer was Emperor Geezy, credited as Festus Ehimare, and produced by Louiza Williams who graduated from the New York Film Academy. The filming and post-production works of the film were wrapped up in early 2021.

Premiere and release
The film was premiered nationwide in Nigeria on 30 April 2021, in cinemas, and was distributed by Bluepictures Distributions. Suga Suga was released on 30 April 2021 in Nigeria by G-Worldwide Entertainment. The film was released to over 200 countries, including the United States, United Kingdom, and Germany on 16 May 2022 via Amazon Prime Video.

References 

English-language Nigerian films
Nigerian romantic comedy films
2021 romantic comedy films
G-Worldwide Entertainment films
2020s English-language films